Ao Meu Brasil (To My Brazil) is an album by Julio Iglesias released on December 18, 2001 by Sony International.  Iglesias sings all the songs in Portuguese.

Track listing
 "Dizem Que Os Homens Não Devem Chorar" (Los Hombres No Deben Llorar)
 "Mal Acostumada"      
 "História de Amor"
 "Se Um Dia Fores Minha" (El Día Que Me Quieras)       
 "Estrada" (La Carretera)      
 "Jogue Para Mim a Culpa" (Echame a Mí la Culpa)   
 "Viver a Vida "(Gozar la Vida) — duet with Daniel
 "Dois Amigos" — duet with Zezé Di Camargo & Luciano
 "Água Doce, Água Do Mar" (Agua Dulce, Agua Salá)        
 "Vida"  
 "Voa Amigo, Voa Alto" (Vuela Amigo, Vuela Alto)        
 "Pelo Amor de Uma Mulher" (Por el Amor de Una Mujer)        
 "Canção Do Mar" (Canción del Mar)

Sales and certifications

References

2001 albums
Julio Iglesias albums
Portuguese-language albums